Sunil Kashyap is an Indian film music composer, singer, and musician in Tollywood. 

Sunil has sung the famous "Azeemo Shan Shehenshah" of A. R. Rahman's Jodhaa Akbar in the dubbed Telugu and Tamil versions.

Early life and education

Nothing much about his childhood or early career is known since his lesser appearances in television interviews and musical functions. Sunil's mother tongue is actually Kannada but he is very familiar with Telugu, as he spent considerable time in Rayalaseema.

He is graduated from Sri Ramakrishna Degree College, Nandyal in Kurnool district .

Sunil came first in a talent show titled 'Ooh Laa Laa' on TV. AR Rehaman was the judge for the show. He has given music to "loafer",a popular Telugu film

Sunil was born in Andhra Pradesh and he spent all his childhood in Cement Nagar studied in St. Anns English Medium High School run by the Kerala nuns and later he studied his secondary school in Panyam Cements High School which is located in Kurnool District. His father was a Mechanical Engineer and he also familiar with music. His brother Anil Kashyap and sister Gayathri are singers, too.

Discography

As composer

As a singer

References 

Living people
Telugu film score composers
Musicians from Andhra Pradesh
Indian male composers
People from Kurnool district
Year of birth missing (living people)
Telugu playback singers